Platystega is an extinct genus of trematosaurian temnospondyl within the family Trematosauridae.

Classification
Below is a cladogram from Steyer (2002) showing the phylogenetic relationships of trematosaurids:

See also
 Prehistoric amphibian
 List of prehistoric amphibians

References

Trematosaurines